Evergreen International Airlines was a charter and cargo airline based in McMinnville, Oregon, United States.  Wholly owned by Evergreen International Aviation, it had longstanding ties to the Central Intelligence Agency (CIA). It operated contract freight services, offering charters and scheduled flights, as well as wet lease services. It operated services for the U.S. military and the United States Postal Service, as well as ad hoc charter flights. Its crew base was at John F. Kennedy International Airport, New York.

Evergreen also maintained a large aircraft maintenance and storage facility at the Pinal Airpark in Marana, Arizona, that the company acquired from the CIA's Air America operation.

History

CIA front
The airline was established by Delford Smith (founder and owner) and began operations in 1960 as Evergreen Helicopters. It acquired the operating certificate of alleged Central Intelligence Agency front company Johnson Flying Service and merged it with Intermountain Airlines (a known CIA front) from Pacific Corporation (also a CIA front) in 1975 to form Evergreen International Airlines. The holding company, Evergreen International Aviation, formed in 1979, wholly owned the airline.  Evergreen also purchased the assets of Air America which had provided fixed wing and helicopter support for the CIA in southeast Asia during the Vietnam conflict.

Evergreen served as an Agency front widely over its history:

Wherever there was a hot spot in the world, Evergreen's helicopters and later airplanes were never far behind. Evergreen's hardware was so inextricably linked with political intrigue that rumors swirled that the company was owned by, or a front for, the U.S. Central Intelligence Agency (CIA). Indeed, several of the company's senior executives either worked for the agency or had close ties to it.

Smith never let on, disingenuously telling the Portland Oregonian in 1988, "We don't know when we've ever worked for them [the CIA], but if we did we're proud of it. We believe in patriotism, and, you know, they're not the [Russian spy service] KGB."

Evergreen bought assets during the 1970s that were previously linked to CIA operations including Montana's Johnson Flying Service and the CIA's aviation 'skunk works' located at the Pinal Airpark in Arizona where Evergreen subsequently performed special maintenance such as servicing the NASA operated Boeing 747 Shuttle Carrier Aircraft used to transport the Space Shuttle.  Evergreen subsequently sold the Pinal Airpark facility to Relativity Capital in 2011.

Officially, the company provided "aviation services" for the CIA, including illegal-drug abatement spraying in Mexico and South America and transporting the Shah of Iran from Egypt to Panama, then Panama to the United States in 1980. Shortly thereafter it ran mysterious missions to El Salvador and Nicaragua.

As public government contractor
Evergreen performed more than military and intelligence community work, also servicing other government agencies in the U.S. as well as in other nations. Its Boeing 747 Supertanker aircraft was used as an firefighting air tanker from Israel to Mexico; its unmanned systems division flew drone flights over disaster zones; NASA hired it to operate its flying infrared observatory; its aircraft supported United Nations peacekeeping operations in 30 countries; flew insect-eradication missions throughout Africa; provided helicopter support for the National Park Service and the U.S. Forest Service; and operated helicopters for FEMA following Hurricane Katrina in Louisiana. Commercially, the airline helped build the Trans-Alaska Pipeline; and developed and serviced the offshore oil and gas market with helicopter support worldwide via its Evergreen Helicopters division.

"All told, Smith said his company flew in 168 countries over the years. 'We were all over the world. Everywhere they needed a helicopter, they needed an airplane as well, said Smith.

Aircraft in film
One of Evergreen's Boeing 747 airplanes (registered N473EV, which suffered an in-flight engine separation in 1993) starred in the 1990 action film Die Hard 2.

Bankruptcy
On November 9, 2013, it was announced that Evergreen Airlines would close on November 30, 2013, due to financial troubles. This information was initially denied by Evergreen, but shortly afterwards admitted: "Evergreen International Airlines flew its last flight Monday [December 2, 2013] Mike Hines, chairman of its parent company board, acknowledged".

On December 31, 2013, Evergreen International Airlines filed a Chapter 7 petition in federal bankruptcy court in Delaware. The bankruptcy filing lists seven entities as submitting the Chapter 7 petition: Evergreen Aviation Ground Logistics Enterprise, Evergreen Defense and Security Services, Evergreen International Airlines, Evergreen International Aviation, Evergreen Systems Logistics, Evergreen Trade, and Supertanker Services.

In June 2014, Evergreen had declared Chapter 7 bankruptcy and began a liquidation of assets, including its headquarters campus in McMinnville.

By the time of Smith's death November 7, 2014, the remains of his once billion-dollar Evergreen Aviation empire had been sold off, shut down, or was in bankruptcy and under investigation by tax authorities.

Destinations
Evergreen International Airlines operated the following freight services (as of December 2012):
Domestic scheduled destinations: Anchorage, New York, Chicago.
International scheduled destinations: Tokyo, Nagoya, Hong Kong, Shanghai.

Fleet

The Evergreen International Airlines fleet consisted of the following aircraft:

Evergreen previously operated three Boeing Dreamlifters to transport the Boeing 787 parts to Boeing, but the contract was given to Atlas Air in September 2010. This was due to Boeing's rescheduled delivery of the Boeing 747-8Fs ordered by Atlas Air to increase their current fleet. The "Dreamlifter" is the logistic support aircraft for Boeing's global Boeing 787 Dreamliner production. The company was also scheduled to operate the SOFIA Boeing 747SP for NASA and the German Aerospace Center at NASA's Ames Research Center in Moffett Field, CA (in the silicon valley near San Jose).

The airline modified a Boeing 747-100 for aerial firefighting, receiving final certification from the FAA in October 2006. Compared to existing large water bombers and airtankers, the Evergreen Supertanker was planned to offer at least seven times more fire retardant capacity. In December 2010, Israel hired Evergreen's fire-fighting aircraft to assist in firefighting efforts of the 2010 Mount Carmel forest fire.

In August 2007, Evergreen announced that it had ordered three Boeing 747-400BCFs to upgrade its commercial operations, with deliveries in summer 2009. In March 2010, the orders had not yet been delivered.  In December 2012, Evergreen ceased operations of the last three 747-200s; they are parked at Portsmouth International Airport at Pease.

A division of Evergreen, Evergreen Airspur, also operated de Havilland Canada DHC-6 Twin Otter STOL aircraft in scheduled commuter airline operations in southern California.

Accidents and incidents
 March 18, 1989: Evergreen International Airlines Flight 17, a DC-9 was on a cargo flight from Kelly Air Force Base outside San Antonio to Tinker Air Force Base outside of Oklahoma City, with a stop at Carswell Air Force Base in Fort Worth. As the plane was departing, the cargo door on the plane opened; the pilot immediately requested emergency return to Carswell. As the plane was approaching on base leg, the cargo door fully opened, which caused the plane to yaw to the left and right, and then roll, until crashing near Saginaw in an inverted position. Both pilots on board were killed. The investigation found that when closing the cargo door, the copilot did not close it fully, but since the locked and latched indicators were applied incorrectly, the copilot thought the door was fully locked.
 December 12, 1991: An Evergreen Boeing 747-100, N475EV, flying from Newark to Tokyo at 31,000 feet suddenly banked 90 degrees to the right and descended at an angle of 30-35 degrees, falling over 10,000 feet before the pilots could regain control. The pilots stabilized the aircraft at 22,500 feet before safely landing safely in Duluth, Minnesota. Official reports indicate the aircraft reached Mach 0.98 during its descent with some reports suggesting the plane broke the sound barrier, reaching speeds as high as Mach 1.25.
 March 31, 1993: Lee waves were believed responsible for the in-flight separation of the #2 engine on an Evergreen Boeing 747-100 operating for Japan Airlines as Japan Air Lines Cargo Flight 46E, registration: N473EV, near Anchorage, Alaska. The plane involved was used in the movie Die Hard 2. The plane was subsequently repaired, continuing in service until 2001.

See also 
 List of defunct airlines of the United States

References

External links

Airlines disestablished in 2013
Airlines for America members
Defunct cargo airlines
Airlines established in 1960
Defunct companies based in Oregon
McMinnville, Oregon
Defunct airlines of the United States
Cargo airlines of the United States
Airlines based in Oregon
Central Intelligence Agency front organizations